The Alderbury-Mottisfont Syncline is an east–west trending fold in the Cretaceous chalk of Hampshire. It lies to the north of the Dean Hill Anticline and south of Salisbury Plain.

Structure

The centre of the syncline is occupied by palaeogene rocks of the Reading Formation, London Clay and Wittering Formation. To the north and south the chalk emerges. At the western end to the south-east of Salisbury the structure is cut by the Mere Fault.

See also
List of geological folds in Great Britain

References

Geology of Hampshire
Geology of Wiltshire